Dni wiatru (Days of Wind) was the second album of Polish group Ścianka, released in 2000. Dni wiatru has received great critical acclaim, being considered one of the best Polish alternative music albums ever. The album was preceded by the EP ...only your bus doesn't stop here.

Track listing
 "Dni wiatru" – 9:08 (Days of wind)
 "Latający pies" – 3:07 (Flying dog)
 "Piotrek" – 11:04 (Petey)
 "19 XI" – 7:28
 "Spychacz" – 7:19 (Bulldozer)
 "The iris sleep under the snow" – 3:44
 "Czarny autobus" – 11:49 (Black bus)
 "***" – 11:42
 "Oceans fall down" – 4:04
 "Czarne anioły" (multimedia track) – video directed by Wojciech Hoffmann. (Black angels)

Personnel
 Maciej Cieślak – guitar, voice
 Jacek Lachowicz – keyboards
 Andrzej Koczan – bass
 Arkady Kowalczyk – drums
 Wojciech Michałowski – bass (8.)

References

External links
 Dni wiatru @ Discogs

2000 albums
Ścianka albums